Khormarud-e Jonubi Rural District is a rural district (dehestan) in Cheshmeh Saran District, Azadshahr County, Golestan Province, Iran. At the 2006 census, its population was 3,003, in 758 families.  The rural district has 5 villages.

References 

Rural Districts of Golestan Province
Azadshahr County